This article lists the results for the China PR national football team between 1970 and 1989.

1971

1972

1973

1974

1975

1976

1977

1978

1980

1981

1982

1983

1984

1985

1986

1987

1988

1989

References
China national football team fixtures and results FIFA.com
Team China official website
中国国家男子足球队历史战绩大全

1970s in China
1980s in China
1970-89